Big Brother is the Dutch version of the international reality television franchise Big Brother. It created the format where contestants live in an isolated house and try to avoid being evicted by viewers to win a prize at the end. As part of the Big Brother franchise, the original Dutch version was initially aired from 1999 to 2006 for six regular seasons and two celebrity editions. Numerous international versions have also been developed following the same structure. In 2021, the cooperation season with Flanders of Big Brother is back in the Netherlands after an absence of 14 years.

Origins

John de Mol
The idea was born on Thursday, 4 September 1997 during a brainstorm session at John de Mol Produkties, an independent part of Endemol. Participants were John de Mol, Patrick Scholtze, Bart Römer and his brother, Paul Römer. The idea called for a luxurious house with six contestants, closed for a year. The winner would receive 1,000,000 guilders. The working title was De Gouden Kooi (The Golden Cage) and the original concept was eventually realized as a reality show on Dutch television at the end of 2006.

The group came up with the idea after the 1991 Biosphere 2 experiment in the Arizona desert, in which eight men and women discovered how hard it is to live together inside an airtight glass and steel geodesic dome that sought to replicate the Earth's environment. Big Brother alternated deprivation with excess.

The format of Big Brother was also influenced by MTV's The Real World, which began in 1992 and originated the concept of putting strangers together for an extended period and recording the drama that ensued. The Real World had introduced "confessions" by housemates. Another pioneering reality format, the Swedish TV show Expedition Robinson, (produced in many countries as Survivor) which first aired in 1997, added to the Real Worlds template the idea of competition, in which contestants battled were removed from the show until only one remained.

The idea of introducing 24/7 streaming video was influenced by websites like Jennicam.org from Jennifer Ringley, a Washington resident who created it in 1997 to share her activities with Webwatchers.

In development, occupancy of the house was reduced to 100 days. An existing house was abandoned in favor of a prefabricated house. This made it possible to install "camera-cross", which allowed cameramen inside the house without being seen by the inhabitants. Originally, the idea was to produce a heavily edited weekly program, but after some experiments with the employees of the production house, the allure of slow television was discovered and the potential for a daily program was realized.

Direction
Among the series initial directors was future filmmaker Tom Six, renowned for The Human Centipede and its sequels.

Orwell lawsuit
George Orwell's book Nineteen Eighty-Four, in which Big Brother is the all-seeing leader of a dystopian nation, has never been acknowledged by the producers. However, the heirs of Orwell settled an agreement with Endemol and the U.S. TV network CBS after legal proceedings against the concept in the American version. The payment has never been revealed.

Voyeurdorm lawsuit
According to a lawsuit in 2000 in a New York federal district court, Big Brother was homegrown in the United States. The idea, said the suit, came out of meetings in summer 1999 between CBS executives and Voyeurdorm.com, a Tampa, Florida adult website of eight college-age women. These women lived, ate, slept, studied and "sunbathed naked" under 55 cameras.

Castaway lawsuit
Also in 2000, the production company Castaway, part-owned by Bob Geldof, sued Endemol for theft of format in a court in Amsterdam, saying the programme was a rip-off of its Survivor-show (Expedition Robinson). A lawyer listed 12 similarities to Survivor. Endemol rejected the allegations, saying: "The genre may be the same, but the programmes are completely different, and they evolved separately. There are 20 or 30 game shows on TV and many different talk shows, but they are in the same genre, not the same programme."

Logo

The logo for Big Brother was designed to fit the housestyle of Dutch television station Veronica. The wave under both names harkens back to the time that Veronica was a pirate station, broadcasting from international waters of the Netherlands. The wave remained when Veronica left the Holland Media Groep and Big Brother was taken over by Yorin. It showed up in the logos of Big Brother all over the world. However, later versions of Dutch Big Brother at Talpa abandoned the logo and are using the eye-logo introduced with the second series of Big Brother UK.

Ethics and Debate

Upon the announcement of the program's format, a debate arose about its ethical acceptability. It was not known whether participants would be shown showering or in the toilet. Though both had been deemed unacceptable, only the latter still holds. Experts argued whether participants should be protected against themselves and whether participation would cause psychological or emotional damage. This discussion included the moral panic in Sweden after the first contestant voted off Expedition Robinson killed himself; his family reportedly blaming the rejection he felt due to being unpopular with the public.

P. van Lange, a social psychologist at the Vrije Universiteit Amsterdam pointed out the similarity to the Stanford Prison Experiment (1971). Participants in that experiment were placed in a jail, where half played guards and the other half prisoners. In six days, the experiment derailed. The guards became aggressive, repressive and sadistic. They transformed into personalities outside their normal selves. "From the Stanford-experiment may be concluded that human behavior is largely summoned by the local circumstances", added his colleague J. van der Pligt, professor at the Universiteit van Amsterdam.
"People get carried away," said A. Bergsma of Psychologie Magazine. "Isolation becomes reality. They lose themselves in the experiment. There are no checks and balances. If there is no correction, they will derail one after another."  
All experts agreed that the big reward for the winner increased the chance of accidents. But not all had a negative opinion. A. Lange, a professor of clinical psychology at the Universiteit van Amsterdam indicated that the program could produce certain insights not possible to achieve any more in socio-psychological research because the psychological well-being of the participant had been given greater importance. "The design of the programme is the wet dream of a psychological researcher. Nowhere in the world an ethical commission will be found that would agree to such a design", agreed psycho-physiologist A. Gaillard of the Netherlands Organisation for Applied Scientific Research.

From the moment Big Brother scored high ratings, the debate shifted to what this fact implied about the character of the Dutch, and if sexual explicit and terms of abuse suited the early broadcasting. What was considered voyeurism now became mainstream entertainment. One explanation was that people had become more isolated and were searching for others to identify with. In this view, talking about Big Brother took the place of backbiting and scandal on the village green.

The debate in the Netherlands has died down and reality TV has become a standard of television programming. In hindsight, it nonetheless became clear that some housemates (like first season's Bart en Ruud) suffered psychological problems akin to post traumatic stress disorder.

Series overview

Regular seasons

VIPs seasons

Secret Story

Big Brother VIPs 
Big Brother VIPs was the first-ever of celebrity spin-off version of the original of the international reality television franchise Big Brother worldwide. The show was broadcast on Veronica from 22 May 2000 to 16 June 2000 for four weeks.

The show was pre-recorded in the Big Brother House were included four different groups of well-known Dutch celebrities known as VIPs. The VIPs of each group were only in the house for five days. There was no winner in this show.

The show could not take advantage of the hype of Big Brother 1, the ratings were significantly lower.

Hotel Big Brother
Hotel Big Brother was the second celebrity spin-off version of the original of the Dutch reality television series Big Brother. The show was broadcast on Talpa from 12 January 2006 to 7 March 2006 for 55 days.

In this show, well-known Dutch celebrities were brought together to operate a hotel as a "hotelier". The proceeds of the hotel would donate to the foundation of Mappa Mondo, for children with a life-threatening illness from the Red Cross in Eindhoven. The target amount was €2,500,000, to be raised in eight weeks.

Outsiders could stay in the hotel. For this, they had to register via the website of the show. On the website, they could reserve a room in the hotel for one or more nights where it was possible that they could be seen on TV.

Each week they will be joined by a new manager called "Big Boss", who will be in charge. The Big Boss will stay for a week and is not part of the competition. Initially, every week a "hotelier" would be voted out by the public, but this concept was immediately abandoned after a few celebrities quit the show.

The show suffered from poor viewing figures and the Red Cross was dissatisfied with the quality delivered, but after some adjustments, which inevitably led to censored TV coverage and often logos on the streams it was nevertheless maintained.

The show ended a week earlier than planned on 7 March 2006 with the "Gala van de Glimlach van een Kind (Gala of the Smile of a Child)" many celebrities participated free of charge.

Big Boss

Guest

See also 
 The Golden Cage

References

External links 
 

 
Dutch reality television series
1999 Dutch television series debuts
2006 Dutch television series endings
2011 Dutch television series debuts
2011 Dutch television series endings
Television controversies in the Netherlands
Television shows filmed in the Netherlands
RTL 7 original programming